Nancy Ellen Brasel (born 1969) is a United States district judge of the United States District Court for the District of Minnesota.

Early life and education 
Born in England, Brasel earned her Bachelor of Arts from Trinity University in 1991, where she was inducted into Phi Beta Kappa, her Master of Arts from the University of Texas at Austin in 1993, and her Juris Doctor, magna cum laude, from the University of Minnesota in 1996, where she was inducted into the Order of the Coif and served as a managing editor of the Minnesota Law Review.

Career
Upon graduation from law school, Brasel served as a law clerk to Judge Donald P. Lay of the United States Court of Appeals for the Eighth Circuit from 1996 to 1997. After her clerkship, Judge Brasel worked in private practice as an associate with the Minneapolis law firm of Leonard, Street and Deinard (now Stinson). In 1999, she became a partner at Greene Espel, P.L.L.P., where her practice focused on business and employment litigation. Prior to her state judicial appointment, she spent three years as an Assistant United States Attorney for the District of Minnesota, where she prosecuted narcotics, firearms, and white collar crimes. In 2011, Minnesota Governor Mark Dayton appointed Brasel to the Minnesota State District Court for the Fourth Judicial District in Hennepin County, where she served until becoming a federal judge. Judge Brasel is the former Chair of the Board of Directors of the Domestic Abuse Project in Minneapolis.

Federal judicial service 

In 2017, Brasel was recommended to the Trump administration as a federal judge by Senator Amy Klobuchar. On February 12, 2018, President Donald Trump announced his intent to nominate Brasel to an undetermined seat on the United States District Court for the District of Minnesota as part of a bipartisan package of judicial nominees which included Minneapolis lawyer Eric Tostrud. On February 15, 2018, her nomination was sent to the Senate. President Trump nominated Brasel to the seat vacated by Judge Ann D. Montgomery, who assumed senior status on May 31, 2016. Brasel was rated as "unanimously well qualified" by the American Bar Association. On April 11, 2018, a hearing on her nomination was held before the Senate Judiciary Committee. On May 10, 2018, her nomination was reported out of committee by a voice vote. On August 28, 2018, her nomination was confirmed by a voice vote. She received her judicial commission on September 13, 2018.

Notable ruling 
In October 2020, Brasel upheld a state court ruling, holding that ballots received seven days after the 2020 election must be counted.

Electoral history 

2012

References

External links 
 

1969 births
Living people
20th-century American lawyers
21st-century American lawyers
21st-century American judges
Assistant United States Attorneys
Judges of the United States District Court for the District of Minnesota
Minnesota lawyers
Minnesota state court judges
People from Durham, England
Trinity University (Texas) alumni
United States district court judges appointed by Donald Trump
University of Texas at Austin alumni
University of Minnesota Law School alumni
20th-century American women lawyers
21st-century American women lawyers
21st-century American women judges